Canadian Party Life (CPL) is an Instagram account and website that showcases Canadian  party and pop culture content. With a large community across its social media platforms, Canadian Party Life posts daily campus videos and pictures submitted from College/University students across Canada. 

While being known as the foundation of Canadian party culture, Canadian Party Life sells merchandise that can be commonly found across the nation on university campuses and students of all years.

References

External links
 

Canadian websites
Instagram accounts